PSA Airlines is an American regional airline headquartered at Dayton International Airport in Dayton, Ohio, United States. The airline is a wholly owned subsidiary of the American Airlines Group and it is paid by fellow group member American Airlines to staff, operate and maintain aircraft used on American Eagle flights that are scheduled, marketed and sold by American Airlines.

PSA Airlines operates a fleet consisting of exclusively Bombardier regional jet aircraft. The company has a team of more than 5,000 employees, operating more than 800 daily flights to nearly 100 destinations.

The airline is named after Pacific Southwest Airlines (commonly known as just PSA), one of the predecessors of today's American Airlines, to protect the trademark.

History

Vee Neal Airlines
Named after its owner Vee Neal Frey, Vee Neal Airlines was established in Latrobe, Pennsylvania and received an air operator's certificate in 1979. At first, the company operated as a fixed-base operator, and later added schedule service between Latrobe and Pittsburgh with a Cessna 402 in May 1980.

Following the Airline Deregulation Act of 1978, nearby Erie, Pennsylvania saw a decline in service, and Vee Neal saw an opportunity.

After several unsuccessful efforts were made between 1980 and late 1982 to start a new airline out of the Erie International Airport, but the plan didn't get off the ground. The catalyst came in April 1983 when USAir announced it would further reduce frequencies out of Erie and would discontinue nonstop service to Chicago. The young airline was able to raise venture capital from a group of civic and business leaders, investors and corporations in the Erie area. The money was used to purchase six British Aerospace Jetstream 31 aircraft.

Jetstream International Airlines
In December 1983, the airline was renamed to Jetstream International Airlines (JIA) after it took delivery of its first two Jetstream aircraft. The next year, the company relocated its maintenance department and corporate headquarters from Latrobe to Erie.

Jetstream established a network of routes between Erie and Chicago, Cleveland, Detroit, Harrisburg, Newark, Philadelphia, Pittsburgh, and Washington, D.C. In addition, Jetstream provided service between Youngstown, Ohio and both airports in Detroit.

The airline struggled financially, but in September 26, 1985 it secured a deal with Piedmont Airlines to operate flights under the Piedmont Commuter brand connecting Erie with Piedmont's Baltimore and Dayton hubs and Youngstown with Baltimore.

Still suffering financially, the next year Piedmont offered to buy Jetstream in a deal that closed on August 1, 1986. Piedmont immediately pivoted Jetstream's business model, making it a Piedmont Commuter feeder for their Dayton hub on September 15, 1986. In 1987, Jetstream once again moved its corporate headquarters, this time to its new base of operations in Dayton.

Parent company Piedmont Airlines was purchased by USAir in November 1987 and was fully merged into the airline on August 5, 1989. After the merger, Jetstream International Airlines started to operate under the USAir Express brand.

PSA Airlines
In the early 1990s, the airline began to replace its namesake Jetstream aircraft, first with leased Embraer EMB 120 aircraft, and later with a purchase of Dornier 328 aircraft.

Reflecting that change, USAir announced that it would rename Jetstream International Airlines as PSA Airlines in November 1995. The name change also allowed USAir to protect the brand name of Pacific Southwest Airlines (commonly known as just PSA), which USAir  had purchased at about the same time that it purchased Piedmont. USAir had previously assigned the Piedmont Airlines name to Henson Airlines in 1993.

Also in November 1995, USAir moved the headquarters of the new PSA Airlines to Vandalia, Ohio.By March 1996, the last Jetstream aircraft was replaced and PSA's fleet of 25 Dornier 328 aircraft was the largest in the world.

In February 1997, USAir changed their name to US Airways, and PSA transitioned to operating under the name of US Airways Express.

On August 11, 2002 US Airways filed for Chapter 11 bankruptcy protection. During the reorganization, PSA was chosen to transition to a fleet of regional jet aircraft, including the Bombardier CRJ200 and CRJ700. The last Dornier 328 was retired from the PSA fleet in September 2004.

USAirways entered a second Chapter 11 bankruptcy on September 12, 2004 and was acquired by America West Airlines in 2005 in a reverse merger.

In February 2005, PSA opened its Charlotte crew base.

The recently opened Philadelphia crew and maintenance bases also closed in September 2005.

In January 2008, US Airways flight activity at the Pittsburgh International Airport was significantly reduced due to market condition changes. US Airways mainline employees took over the US Airways Express flight operations at the airport and PSA ceased providing ground-handling services at the airport.

In 2015, after the merger of American Airlines and US Airways, PSA became part of American Airlines Group and started to operate American Eagle flights.

In August 2015, PSA Airlines announced a maintenance base would be established at Cincinnati/Northern Kentucky International Airport.

In August 2016, PSA Airlines announced a new 45,000-square-foot maintenance base would be opening in late 2016 at the Greenville-Spartanburg International Airport (GSP).

Fleet
, the PSA Airlines fleet consists of these aircraft:

In December 2013, American Airlines announced that it had ordered 30 Bombardier CRJ-900 jets and was assigning them to PSA Airlines. The airline began taking deliveries of them in the second quarter of 2014 to finish initial delivery in 2015. In addition, American acquired options to purchase up to 40 additional CRJ-900 aircraft scheduled to be delivered in 2015 through 2016. Due to the COVID-19 pandemic, the CRJ-200 fleet consisting of 35 aircraft was retired at an accelerated rate.

Crew bases 
As of November 2022, PSA Airlines uses these airports as crewmember domiciles:
Charlotte Douglas International Airport
Dayton International Airport
Philadelphia International Airport
Ronald Reagan Washington National Airport
Dallas Fort Worth International Airport

Maintenance bases 
As of May 2022, PSA Airlines has maintenance bases at the following airports:
Akron-Canton Airport
Charlotte Douglas International Airport
Cincinnati/Northern Kentucky International Airport
Dayton International Airport
Norfolk International Airport
Greenville-Spartanburg International Airport
Pensacola International Airport
Savannah/Hilton Head International Airport

See also 
 Air transportation in the United States

References

External links 
 

 
Companies based in Dayton, Ohio
Airlines established in 1980
Regional Airline Association members
Regional airlines of the United States
Airlines based in Ohio
Airlines for America members
American Airlines Group
Companies that filed for Chapter 11 bankruptcy in 2002
Companies that filed for Chapter 11 bankruptcy in 2004
1980 establishments in Pennsylvania
American companies established in 1980